The 5th Corps of Air Force and Air Defense (Serbo-Croatian: 5. korpus ratnog vazduhoplovstva i protivvazdušne odbrane/ 5. корпус ратног ваздухопловства и противваздушне одбране) was a joint unit of Yugoslav Air Force established in 1964 as 5th Aviation Corps (Serbo-Croatian: 5. vazduhoplovni korpus / 5. ваздухопловни корпус).

History

5th Aviation Corps
The 5th Aviation Corps was formed by order from May 8, 1964, due to the "Drvar 2" reorganization plan of the Yugoslav Air Force. It was created by transformation of 5th Air Command and its consolidation with units from 9th Air Command. It consisted of all aviation units from western part of Yugoslavia at military airports Pleso, Lučko, Cerklje, Bihać, Pula and Zemunik.

By order from February, 1986, it was renamed as the 5th Corps of Air Force and Air Defense.

In this period commanders of 5th Aviation Corps were Viktor Bubanj, Enver Čemalović, Radoje Ljubičić, Slobodan Alagić, Anton Tus, Čedomir Kovačević, Nikola Benić and Đorđije Zvicer.

5th Corps of Air Force and Air Defense
The 5th Corps of Air Force and Air Defense was for me in February 1986, by order to organize three corps of Air Force and Air Defense. The corps area of responsibility was of northwest Yugoslavia.

Units of 5th Corps of Air Force and Air Defense have participated in combat operations since end of June 1991. During the combats, in September 1991 command of corps has been dislocated to Bihać Air Base. Due to the withdrawal of Yugoslav People's Army units from hostile territory of Slovenia and Croatia, the area of responsibility has been reduced and some military airports, barracks and bases have been abandoned.

The units of 5th Corps have been intensively engaged in combat due they were located at the territory affected by wars in Slovenia, Croatia and later in Bosnia and Herzegovina. It is notable that units of 5th Corps had only Yugoslav Air Force air-to-air victory and that four pilots of Croatian nationality have defected with their MiG-21 fighters.

There was plan to reorganized corps in to 2nd Corps of Air Force and Air Defense  from units that have been withdrawn to territory of Bosnia and Herzegovina and but that plan was never realized.

By May 12, 1992, the 5th Corps of Air Force and Air Defense has been disbanded. It was planned to withdraw all units and equipment from territory of Bosnia and Herzegovina to Serbia and Montenegro. Some units consisting mostly of Bosnian Serbs refused that order forming the new Republika Srpska Air Force.

In this period commanders of 5th Corps of Air Force and Air Defense were Zvonko Jurjević, Živan Mirčetić, Marjan Rožić and Ljubomir Bajić.

Assignments
Command of Yugoslav Air Force (1964-1992)

Previous designations
5th Aviation Corps (1964-1986)
5th Corps of Air Force and Air Defense (1986-1992)

Organization

1964-1966
5th Aviation Corps
289th Signal Battalion 
379th Engineering Battalion
122nd Hydroplane Liaison Squadron
97th Support Aviation Regiment 
109th Fighter-Bomber Aviation Regiment
111th Support Aviation Regiment 
117th Fighter Aviation Regiment 
184th Reconnaissance Aviation Regiment 
172nd Fighter-Bomber Aviation Regiment
84th Air Base
151st Air Base
200th Air Base
258th Air Base
474th Air Base

1966-1968
5th Aviation Corps
289th Signal Battalion 
379th Engineering Battalion
97th Support Aviation Regiment 
82nd Aviation Brigade
111th Support Aviation Regiment 
84th Air Base
151st Air Base
200th Air Base
258th Air Base
474th Air Base

1968-1978
5th Aviation Corps
289th Signal Battalion 
379th Engineering Battalion
82nd Aviation Brigade
111th Support Aviation Regiment 
84th Air Base
151st Air Base
200th Air Base
258th Air Base
474th Air Base
130th Air Base

1978-1986
5th Aviation Corps
289th Signal Battalion 
379th Engineering Battalion
351st Reconnaissance Aviation Squadron (until 1982)
466th Light Combat Aviation Squadron (until 1982)
467th Light Combat Aviation Squadron (until 1984)
15th Air Defense Division 
82nd Fighter-Bomber Aviation Regiment (Aviation Brigade)
111th Transport Aviation Regiment (Aviation Brigade) 
84th Air Base
151st Air Base
200th Air Base
258th Air Base
474th Air Base
130th Air Base

1986-199
5th Corps of Air Force and Air Defense
289th Signal Battalion 
379th Engineering Battalion
5th Air Reconnaissance Regiment
155th Air Defense Missile Regiment
350th Air Defense Missile Regiment
82nd Aviation Brigade
111th Aviation Brigade 
117th Fighter Aviation Regiment
84th Air Base
151st Air Base
200th Air Base
258th Air Base
474th Air Base

Headquarters
Zagreb (1964-1991)
Bihać (1991-1992)

Commanding officers

References

Corps of Yugoslav Air Force
Military units and formations established in 1964